Pit-3 Dam (also known as Pit Number Three Dam and Dam Number Three) is a hydroelectric dam on the Pit River in northern California in the United States. It forms Lake Britton, and is owned by the Pacific Gas and Electric Company (PG&E).

Specifications
The dam has a gated spillway with three steel gates and three inflatable rubber gates. There are three 23.3 MW generators, for a total capacity of 69.9 MW.

The lake level changes on a weekly basis with greater drawdowns during the weekdays for power generation, and refilling on the weekends. In addition to generating power at the Pit 3 hydroelectric station, the reservoir also helps regulate water flowing through the Pit 4 and Pit 5 stations downstream.

The dam is the place where Pacific Crest Trail crosses the Pit River.

History
Construction was completed in 1925.

See also
List of dams and reservoirs in California

References

Dams in California
Dams on the Pit River
Gravity dams
Pacific Gas and Electric Company dams
Buildings and structures in Shasta County, California
Dams completed in 1925
1925 establishments in California